Harvest Time is a 2004 Russian drama film directed by Marina Razbezhkina. It was entered into the 26th Moscow International Film Festival.

Plot
The film is set in a Chuvash village during the early 1950s. Antonina Guseva lives with her husband Gennadiy, a disabled war veteran, and two young sons, Vanya and Kolya. Narration (voice-over) is on behalf of Kolya. Antonina is the best combine operator of the district, and she is awarded with a transferable Red Banner (instead of the calico piece she desired). Mice spoil the banner, and Antonina has to not only continuously repair it, but also to win again in the Socialist emulation, so that the banner remains with her and the authorities do not notice the consequences of "diversionist activities" by the mice. Gennadiy becomes a drunkard and passes away.

The last scene is set in a city apartment of the times of perestroika. After the death of Antonina, who survived her sons, old furniture is taken out from the flat. On TV the film Guest from Kuban with a song about combine operators is transmitted. An unknown girl casually browses photos and things from the village house, which are about to go to the dump. She takes out a small piece of red velvet (everything that remains of the Red Banner), wraps her head with it and goes to the street.

Kolya's voice-over:

Cast
 Lyudmila Motornaya as Antonina
 Vyacheslav Batrakov as Gennadiy
 Dmitri Yakovlev as Vanya (as Dima Yakovlev)
 Dmitri Yermakov as Kolya (as Dima Yermakov)
 Sergei Starostin as Narrator (voice)
 Vika Vasilyeva (voice)
 Sainkho Namtchylak (voice)
 Dmitri Derduga as Vanya (voice) (as Dima Derduga)
 Mikhail Izotov as Kolya (voice) (as Misha Izotov)
 Svetlana Efremova as Singer

References

External links
 

2004 films
2004 drama films
Russian drama films
2000s Russian-language films